Piñones State Forest, (in ), and named after the Casuarina, locally called  (after an invasive species of salt-tolerant tree from Australia used for lumber), is a timberland forest near one of the longest beaches in Puerto Rico. It is located in Torrecilla Baja barrio in the municipality of Loíza. It is a tourist attraction and is managed by the Puerto Rico Department of Natural and Environmental Resources.

Geographical location
Home of a mangrove forest, Piñones is a natural reserve located east of Isla Verde north of Luis Muñoz Marín International Airport. It is operated by the Puerto Rico Department of Natural and Environmental Resources and located in Loiza.

Flora and fauna
The extremely rare tree Schoepfia arenaria grows here at a place called Punta Maldonado. Less than 200 of these Puerto Rican endemic trees are known to exist.

The Piñones Trail
There is a boardwalk and trail used for biking and walking through parts of the forest. Several agencies carefully manage the Piñones Trail (in ), so as to avoid disturbing sensitive ecological and archeological points, while still encouraging "family-type" visits. In 2001, the trail received an award from the Federal Highway Administration for excellence in non-motorized transportation.

Activities nearby 
Near the forest is a beach called  and kiosks including,  on PR-187 mentioned by the Puerto Rico Tourism Company.

Gallery

See also

 List of Puerto Rico state forests
 List of National Natural Landmarks in Puerto Rico

References

Puerto Rico state forests
Tourist attractions in Puerto Rico
Biosphere reserves of the United States
Tropical and subtropical moist broadleaf forests of the United States
Loíza, Puerto Rico